The Thailand men's national under-23 volleyball team represents the Thailand for the under-23 and 22 level in international volleyball competitions. It is managed by the Thailand Volleyball Association.

Team

Coaching staff

Current squad
The following 12 players were called up for the 2017 Asian Men's U23 Volleyball Championship in Ardabil, Iran.

Record against selected opponents
Record against opponents in Asian Championships:

Competition history

Asian Championship

See also

 Thailand men's national volleyball team
 Thailand women's national under-23 volleyball team
 Thailand men's national under-21 volleyball team
 Thailand men's national under-19 volleyball team

References

External links
Official website
FIVB profile

M
National men's under-23 volleyball teams 
Men's volleyball in Thailand